The 1993–94 National Hurling League was the 63rd edition of the National Hurling League, which ran from 17 October 1993 until 8 May 1994.

Thirty-two teams participated in the league, comprising four divisions of eight teams. Two points were awarded for a win and one point was awarded for a drawn game. The knock-out phase featured the top four teams from division one and the top two teams from division two.

Tipperary won the league, beating Galway by 2-14 to 0-12 in the final.

Overview

Division 1

The National Hurling League's top division featured eight teams. Galway, the 1993 All-Ireland runners-up, suffered just one defeat, topped the group and guaranteed themselves a place in the National League semi-final. Reigning league champions Cork finished second and booked their place in the second semi-final. Third placed Tipperary and fourth placed Antrim secured their places in the league quarter-finals. In spite of finished third, Tipperary defeated Galway in the National League final to secure their 16th title. It was the team's last silverware under the management of Michael "Babs" Keating.

Down at the other end of the table, Waterford, with five defeats, and Wexford, with six defeats, were relegated to Division 2 for the following season.

Division 2

In Division 2, Clare and reigning All-Ireland champions Kilkenny finished first and second respectively, thus securing automatic promotion to Division 1 for the following season. They also earned a place in the National League quarter-finals.

Westmeath, who only managed one draw during the group stage, were automatically relegated to Division 3.

Division 3

Carlow finished the group stage without defeat, topping the group with 14 points. Their success ensured automatic promotion to Division 2.

Mayo lost all seven of their group games, finishing with a points difference of -100, and were relegated to Division 4.

Division 4

Louth were the standard bearers in Division 4. They recorded six wins from seven games, thus ensuring their promotion to Division 3 for the 1994-95 National Hurling League.

Cavan lost all seven of their group games, finishing with a points difference of -116. They had the dubious honour of being the worst hurling team in Ireland.

Division 1

For the second time in three years, the league saw a major restructuring. The twelve-team Division 1 which was split into two groups of six was abolished in favour of a single eight-team division.

Cork came into the season as defending champions of the 1992-93 season.

On 8 May 1994, Tipperary won the title after a 2-14 to 0-12 win over Galway in the final. It was their 16th league title overall and their first since 1987-88.

Waterford and Wexford were relegated from Division 1.

Waterford's Paul Flynn was the Division 1 top scorer with 0-39.

Table

Group stage

Knock-out stage

Quarter-finals

Semi-finals

Final

Scoring statistics

Top scorers overall

Top scorers in a single game

Division 2

In spite of a major restructuring of the league, Division 2 remained as a single unit consisting of eight teams.

Laois came into the season as defending champions of the 1992-93 season.

On 20 March 1994, Clare secured the title after an 0-11 to 0-9 win over Westmeath in the final round of the group stage.

Westmeath were relegated from Division 2.

Dublin's Aonghus O'Grady was the Division 2 top scorer with 2-38.

Table

Group stage

Scoring statistics

Top scorers overall

Top scorers in a single game

Division 3

Table

Division 4

Table

External links

References

National Hurling League seasons
League
League